Abay is both a surname and a given name. Notable people with the name include:

Aydo Abay (born 1973), German singer and songwriter of Turkish descent
Dong Abay (born 1971), Filipino musician
Korhan Abay (born 1954), Turkish actor
Oszkár Abay-Nemes (1913–1959), Hungarian swimmer
Péter Abay (born 1962), Hungarian fencer
Yordanos Abay (born 1984), Ethiopian footballer
Abay Bokoleyev (born 1996), Kyrgyz footballer
Abay Qunanbayuli (1845–1904), Kazakh poet
Abay Tsehaye (1953–2021), Ethiopian politician
Abay Weldu (born 1965), Ethiopian politician

Turkish-language surnames